Adán Jodorowsky or Adanowsky (born 29 October 1979) is a French-Mexican musician, director and actor.

Biography 
Jodorowsky was born in France on 29 October 1979. Jodorowsky is the son of the Chilean filmmaker Alejandro Jodorowsky and French actress Valérie Trumblay, brother to Brontis Jodorowsky and Axel Jodorowsky and the uncle of Alma Jodorowsky.

He has appeared in seven films to this day. As an actor, he won the Saturn Award for Best Performance by a Younger Actor in 1989 for his role in Santa Sangre as young Fénix, one of his father's more renowned films.

On 30 October 2006 he released his first solo album, Étoile Éternelle, as "Adanowsky", and his first single, "L'idole" (meaning "the idol") which was also released in Spanish as "El Ídolo"; the song is about a waiter who wants all the attention and dreams of becoming famous and an idol.

In 2007 he featured as an actor in the Julie Delpy's movie 2 Days In Paris. In 2008, he released his second album, El Ídolo and had a big success in many countries.

In 2011 he released his third solo album Amador and won the UFI award for "Best International Artist Of The Year" and "Best Live Show". Then he met Devendra Banhart, and together, they recorded the song "You are the one" and "Dime Cuándo". He also helped on Alizée's new album, writing a song for her called "La Cándida".

He has composed works such as Echek (2000) and Teou (2001), "The Dance of Reality" as well as directing Echek, Un Sol Con Corazón and El Ídolo, Dancing To The Radio, and the movie The Voice Thief starring himself and Cristóbal Jodorowsky as well as Asia Argento as the lead actress.

In 2012 he produced the first solo (golden) album of León Larregui (lead singer of Mexican band "Zoé").

In 2013 Adán appeared in his father's film The Dance of Reality and composed its soundtrack.

In 2014 he produced and released the Album Ada.

He won 5 prizes for his movie The Voice Thief as Best Director and Best Movie. Also in 2014 Diane Pernet selected this movie to compete at the ASVOFF festival, the first annual festival in the world about fashion films.

In 2015 Adán Jodorowsky directed a video for his song "Would You Be Mine" with the porn actress Stoya. He is now acting the main character (young Alejandro Jodorowsky) in his father's movie Poesía sin fin, which is the second part of La Danza De La Realidad.

Filmography

Discography

Singles 
 L'idole (Also released as El Idolo in Spanish)
 Estoy Mal
 No
 Me Siento Solo
 Dancing to the Radio
 Would you be mine

References

External links 
 
 
 Super 45's interview with Adanowsky in Spanish
 Adanowsky Fans Club
 Vídeo for the song Estoy Mal

1979 births
Living people
French male film actors
French people of Mexican descent
French people of Chilean descent
French people of Russian-Jewish descent